The Jining–Arun Banner Expressway, commonly referred to as the Ji'a Expressway is a planned expressway that will connect Arun Banner, Hulunbuir, Inner Mongolia, China, and Jining District, Ulanqab, Inner Mongolia. The expressway is a spur of G55 Erenhot–Guangzhou Expressway and will be completely in Inner Mongolia. The expressway is currently partly opened for 3 sections.

References

Chinese national-level expressways
Expressways in Inner Mongolia